Relaxin-3 is a neuropeptide  that was discovered in 2001, and which is highly conserved in species ranging from flies, fish, rodents and humans. Relaxin-3 is a member and ancestral gene of the relaxin family of peptides, which includes the namesake hormone relaxin (designated 'H2 relaxin' in humans) which mediates peripheral actions during pregnancy and which was found to relax the pelvic ligament in guinea pigs almost a century ago. The cognate receptor for relaxin-3 is the G-protein coupled receptor RXFP3 (relaxin family peptide 3 receptor), however relaxin-3 is pharmacologically able to also cross react with RXFP1 and RXFP3 (although the physiological relevance of such interactions, if they exist endogenously, are currently unknown).

Structure
Relaxin-3 consists of 51 amino acids in humans which are arranged into a two-chain structure (designated the A-chain and B-chain). There are three disulfide bonds (two interchain, one intrachain), with the residues that mediate binding to/activation of RXFP3 residing within the B-chain. At translation, pro-relaxin-3 also contains a C-chain (in between the A and B-chains) which is removed via protolytic cleavage to form the mature neuropeptide.

Distribution
Relaxin-3 is mostly expressed within neurons of the brain, where it is packaged into dense cored vesicles and trafficked along axons where it can be detected in presynaptic vesicles before release onto target neurons, characteristic of a neurotransmitter. The largest number of relaxin-3-positive neurons in the rodent brain are within a region of the pontine brainstem known as the nucleus incertus, while smaller populations are present within the pontine raphe, periaqueductal grey, and an area dorsal to the substantia nigra. From these centres, relaxin-3 innervates a broad range of brain regions which are also rich in RXFP3 mRNA/binding sites, including the extended limbic system and the septohippocampal pathway.

Function
The broad distribution of relaxin-3 fibres/RXFP3 within several key neuronal circuits suggests an ability to modulate a broad range of behaviours. This has been confirmed in a growing number of rodent studies, which demonstrate relaxin-3 is able to modulate arousal, the response to stress, feeding/metabolism and memory; and likely plays a role in the generation/regulation of hippocampal theta rhythm.

Relevance to human disease
Neuropeptides such as relaxin-3 are attracting increasing interest as targets for the pharmacological treatment of a range of neuropsychiatric diseases. Due to the ability of relaxin-3 to modulate neuronal processes/behaviours such as mood, stress responses and cognition, which are often aberrant in mental illnesses, considerable potential exists for the development of relaxin-3-based drugs to therapeutically treat depression and other mental illnesses.

See also
 Relaxin family peptide hormones
 Insulin/IGF/Relaxin family
 Relaxin
 Relaxin/insulin-like family peptide receptor 1

References

Neuropeptides